Sonwabise 'Soso' Rungqu (born 24 May 1983), is a South African actress and singer. She is best known for her role in the popular serial Isidingo.

Personal life
She was born on 24 May 1983 in Amalinda, East London, South Africa. In 1991, she  matriculated from Clarendon High School for Girls. She  graduated with a degree in Performance Art in Musical Theatre at the Tshwane University of Technology, Pretoria. Her father died in 2015.

She is married and is a mother of a son.

Career
In 2007, she made her first theater role in the play The Frog Prince and other stories performed at the Civic Theatre, (currently known as the Johannesburg Theater). Soso made the popular voice over of the animated character 'Smartycat' on kids' show Cool Catz from 2008 to 2010. In the meantime, she also performed in theater for high schools and primary schools. Then she worked with the department of Arts and Culture for few years. Her maiden television role came as in PHD Child Case studies for the Mindset Network Health channel.

At first, she made cameo appearance on several popular television serials: Mzansi Love, Scandal!, Rhythm City, Sokhulu & Partners and 7de Laan. Meanwhile, she featured in the television series HeartLaughs as part of a DVD "Values in Action". In 2014, she appeared in the short films Awakening and then in the film Beneath the Art in 2015. In the same year, she voiced a role on the radio drama uHambolwethu aired on TruFM.

In 2016, she became highly popular with the role 'Kau Morongwa' on soap opera Isidingo. She continued to play the role until 2018 where she quit from the show to look after her sick father.

Television serials
 7de Laan as Lerato
 Igazi as Queen Ngxabani
 Isidingo as Morongwa Kau
 It's OK We're Family as Soso Rungqu
 Mzansi Love as Zandile
 Rhythm City as Junkie Girl
 Scandal! as Kagiso
 Sokhulu & Partners as Deirdre Hosa
 Tjovitjo as Kopano
 Zaziwa as herself
 Generations: The Legacy as Detective Zanele
 Presenter Umakhelwane on Moja Love 157

References

External links
 

Living people
South African television actresses
1983 births
South African film actresses
People from East London, Eastern Cape
Alumni of Clarendon High School for Girls